Nocarodes is a genus of grasshoppers in the family Pamphagidae. There are at least 20 described species in Nocarodes, found in southeastern Europe and southwestern Asia.

Species
These 20 species belong to the genus Nocarodes:

 Nocarodes aserbus Mistshenko, 1951
 Nocarodes balachowskyi Descamps, 1967
 Nocarodes corrugatus Mistshenko, 1951
 Nocarodes crispus Mistshenko, 1951
 Nocarodes daghestanicus Uvarov, 1928
 Nocarodes ebneri Ramme, 1951
 Nocarodes geniculatus Uvarov, 1928
 Nocarodes humerosus Mistshenko, 1951
 Nocarodes iranicus (Werner, 1939)
 Nocarodes keredjensis (Werner, 1939)
 Nocarodes liebmanni (Werner, 1939)
 Nocarodes nanus Mistshenko, 1951
 Nocarodes nodosus Mistshenko, 1951
 Nocarodes pullus (Mistshenko, 1951)
 Nocarodes sanctidavidi (Shugurov, 1912)
 Nocarodes scabiosus Mistshenko, 1951
 Nocarodes serricollis Fischer von Waldheim, 1846
 Nocarodes urmianus Ramme, 1939
 Nocarodes variegatus Fischer von Waldheim, 1846
 Nocarodes znojkoi Miram, 1938

References

Pamphagidae